The FTBOA Florida Sire Stakes Dr. Fager division is the first leg of the FTBOA Florida Sire Stakes series. Inaugurated in 1982, the race was named after the Florida-bred Horse of the Year and leading sire Dr. Fager. The race was originally run at a length of  furlongs, but it was moved to 6 furlongs after the inaugural running. The Dr. Fager Stakes has run in two divisions more times than either of the other two races in the Florida Stallion Stakes, with a grand total of eight races ran in two parts (1983–1987, 1990, 1991, 2001).

Since 2014, the race has been run at Gulfstream Park. Originally, it was run at Calder Race Course

Records
Speed record: (at current distance of 6 furlongs)
 2005 In Summation (1:10.90 at Calder)
 2016 Three Rules (1:09.49 at Gulfstream)

Most wins by a jockey:
 3 – Gene St. Leon ((Div.2 1983, 1984) 1988)

Most wins by a trainer:
 5 – Frank Gomez ((Div.2 – 1984, 1987, 1990, 1991) and 2005)

Most wins by an owner:
 3 – Frances A. Genter (Div.2 – 1984, 1987, 1990)

Winners

Second Division Winners

References

Horse races in Florida
Flat horse races for two-year-olds
Recurring sporting events established in 1982
Calder Race Course
1982 establishments in Florida